Micheal Ward (born 1996 or 1997) is a Jamaican-British actor and former model. His films include Blue Story (2018) and The Old Guard (2020). On television, he appeared in Top Boy and The A List. Ward was awarded the 2020 BAFTA Rising Star Award.

Early life
Micheal Ward was born in Spanish Town, Jamaica to then 18-year-old mother Keisha. He has three sisters. His father was killed in a car crash when Micheal was two years old.

Ward then moved to Hackney, East London with his mother and sister at the age of four, with the help of his aunt and uncle who ran a Caribbean restaurant in Chadwell Heath. The family later moved to Romford. He attended Chadwell Heath Academy and then studied performing arts at Epping Forest College after dropping out of sixth form. He worked delivering food for his aunt’s restaurant as a teenager and then later worked at a bookmakers shop.

Career
Ward began his career while he was at college when he signed with the talent agency. Through the agency, he landed roles in music videos for artists such as Lily Allen and Tom Walker.

At the age of seventeen, Ward won the Face of JD Sports modelling competition. He has since modelled a number of brands and was handpicked by Virgil Abloh to model for Louis Vuitton's AW20 menswear campaign in August 2020.

Ward made his film debut in Brotherhood in 2016. He starred in the first series of the teen thriller The A List on BBC iPlayer in 2018 and reprised his role for its second series on Netflix. Ward's breakout year came in 2019, when he starred as Jamie in Netflix's revival and third series of Top Boy. He also appeared in a leading role in the film Blue Story in the same year. The film received critical acclaim, and Ward won the BAFTA Rising Star Award for his performance.

Ward appeared in Steve McQueen’s Small Axe: Lovers Rock in 2020, for which he received a BAFTA nomination for Best Actor in a Supporting Role.  He was cast alongside Bill Nighy in the upcoming film The Beautiful Game.

Ward starred alongside Olivia Colman, Colin Firth and Tanya Moodie in Sam Mendes' 2022 film Empire of Light. The film was released in the USA in December 2022, with the release in the UK in January 2023. In January 2023 it was announced that Ward was included on the longlist in the best supporting actor category for the 76th British Academy of Film and Television Arts awards.

In December 2022, he was cast in Jeymes Samuel's The Book of Clarence.

Personal life
Ward is an Arsenal fan. He went to school with the English professional footballer Rhian Brewster. Ward was named in Forbes 30 under 30 list in 2020. Ward became a British citizen in 2015.

Filmography

Film

Television

Music videos

Awards and nominations

References

External links

Micheal Ward, Twitter account

21st-century English actors
1990s births
Living people
BAFTA Rising Star Award winners
Black British male actors
English people of Jamaican descent
People from Romford
People from Spanish Town
Jamaican emigrants to the United Kingdom
Naturalised citizens of the United Kingdom
People from Hackney, London
Male actors from London